The Thor Lake mine is a large mine located in the northern part of Canada in Northwest Territories. Thor Lake represents one of the largest tantalum reserves in Canada having estimated reserves of 70 million tonnes of ore grading 0.03% tantalum and 0.04% niobium.

References 

Tantalum mines in Canada